The British R.23X class of rigid airships were developed during World War I using the experiences gained from the 23 class, but only two of the planned four R.23X class were built: R.27 and R.29. Both were completed mid-1918, but just  months after entering service R.27 was destroyed by fire in a hangar; while R.29 went on to become the most successful British wartime rigid airship, being the only one to meet enemy action, as well as the only one to sink a submarine.

Design and development
The Vickers-designed 23 class rigid airships, which were basically "stretched" and modified versions of the No. 9 design, were never used in combat; however, the four ships in the class provided many hours of valuable training for British airship crews and experimental data for designers and engineers, and some radical changes and refinements were consequently incorporated into the design of the R.23X class. Originally four R.23X class were planned, R.27 to R.30 consecutively, but the programme was re-evaluated following the forced landing of L 33 (Z33) in Little Wigborough, Essex, on 24 September 1916. British engineers gained a valuable insight into the state of German rigid airship design and technology when they examined the virtually intact Zeppelin, and it was subsequently decided to cancel R.28 and R.30 in order to concentrate resources on an improved design, the new R33 class.

Hull
Redesigned bow and stern sections increased the gas capacity slightly for a corresponding increase in lift, but a more radical measure was the removal of the external keel corridor from the R.23X design. Not contributing significantly to the strength of the hull, the keel's main function was to distribute the weight of the fuel tanks, ballast bags and other heavy items, as well as to allow the crew to travel between the cars, and its removal effected a considerable reduction in weight together with improved manoeuvrability. Instead, the various loads were concentrated at the bulkheads and suspended from the radial wiring that maintained the shape of the hull. The gas-bags were shaped to accommodate a new internal corridor, created by the provision of inverted "U"-shaped ribs above the two lowest longitudinal members, which also allowed access to the fuel tanks and ballast. An improved system of pipes linking the fuel tanks enabled faster refuelling, and could be used to jettison fuel in an emergency. However, as with earlier designs, doped linen was used for the hull's outer covering; and being absorbent, just a few hours of rain could add around a ton of water to the weight.

Propulsion and testing
The R.23X class were powered by four  Rolls-Royce Eagle VI engines – later and more powerful versions of those employed by the 23r class, but arranged in a similar manner. The fore and aft gondolas each housed a single engine driving a pair of swivelling propellers, one either side, while the centre car contained two engines with one fixed propeller each.

As a result of the removal of the external keel, when the first trials were held the two airships were able to turn more quickly than their predecessors; but more importantly it was discovered during the lift and trim tests that the disposable lift was more than 8 tons. This was significantly better than any previous British airship, and allowed a greater bomb load to be carried as well as more fuel for increased range.

Operational history

R.27
R.27 was constructed by William Beardmore and Company at Inchinnan, Renfrewshire, and commissioned on 29 June 1918. Under the command of Major Ommaney she flew for a total of 89 hours 40 minutes, and came to a premature end while at RNAS (Royal Naval Air Service) Howden airship station on 16 August that year. Sharing a hangar with R.27 was a makeshift SSZ class blimp that was being assembled from a disused envelope and a spare SS Zero car. Petrol fumes from a spillage in the car were ignited some time later by a spark when the radio equipment was being tested; and the ensuing fireball, fed by fuel and gas, completely enveloped and destroyed both craft. Although the hangar itself survived, one airman lost his life, and two further blimps that were moored nearby, SSZ.38 and SSZ.54, were also destroyed.

R.29
R.29 was constructed by Armstrong Whitworth Aircraft at Barlow, North Yorkshire, and was commissioned on 20 June 1918. She was based at the East Fortune RNAS airship station in East Lothian, Scotland, where her operational career lasted less than five months. During this time she flew for 335 hours, covered an estimated , and became the most successful British wartime "rigid".

She carried out a number of extensive patrols including one lasting over 30 hours, and two others for more than 20 hours. During the attack, in which R.29 was joined by armed trawlers and the destroyers HMS Ouse and Star, she dropped two  bombs. Intelligence reports subsequently confirmed that the submarine had been destroyed in the attack – the only recorded success by any British wartime rigid airship.

R.29 flew another 16 hours after the Armistice, and in May 1919 her midship car was replaced by a smaller and lighter type containing just one engine driving a single propeller. She subsequently flew a further 87 hours including an extended flight over Scotland accompanied by R34, and was finally deleted in October, 1919. She covered an estimated  in service, more than any previous British rigid airship.

Operators

Royal Naval Air Service / Royal Air Force

Specifications

Notes

References
 Griehl, Manfred and Joachim Dressel. Zeppelin! The German Airship Story, 1990 
 Morpurgo, J.E. Barnes Wallis - A Biography, Longman, 1972  
 Mowthorpe, Ces. Battlebags: British Airships of the First World War, 1995 
 Ventry, Lord and Eugene Kolesnik. Jane's Pocket Book 7 - Airship Development, 1976 
 Ventry, Lord and Eugene Kolesnik. Airship saga: The history of airships seen through the eyes of the men who designed, built, and flew them , 1982

External links 

 HMA 23X class airships, The Airship Heritage Trust

Airships of the United Kingdom
1910s British military trainer aircraft
Aircraft first flown in 1918